Revoiced is a compilation album by the German progressive metal band Dreamscape. It is a compilation of songs re-recorded from their first two albums with their line-up at the time.

Track listing 

 "Thorn in My Mind" – 5:28
 "Fateful Silence" – 4:43
 "Alone" – 4:36
 "She's Flying" – 5:14
 "Changes" – 5:21
 "Fearing the Daylight" – 5:08
 "Unvoiced (Lost Parts)" – 8:44
 "Reborn" – 4:26
 "Face Your Fears" – 5:31
 "Winter Dreams" – 5:54
 "Loneliness" – 4:48
 "When Shadows are Gone" – 4:54

Line-up 

Roland Stoll - vocals
Wolfgang Kerinnis - guitars
Jan Vacik - keyboards
Benno Schmidtler - bass
Klaus Engl - drums

References 
Revoiced @ Encyclopaedia Metallum
DREAMSCAPE Revoiced music reviews and MP3 @ proarchives.com

2005 compilation albums
Dreamscape (band) compilation albums
Massacre Records compilation albums